Rollo Lloyd (March 22, 1883 – July 24, 1938) was an American actor who appeared in about 65 films. His films include Today We Live, Strictly Personal, The Lives of a Bengal Lancer, Mad Love, Magnificent Obsession, The Devil-Doll, Anthony Adverse, Seventh Heaven, Armored Car, The Last Train from Madrid, Souls at Sea and The Lady in the Morgue, among others.

In 1920, Lloyd was selected as the Director and a leading actor for the summer at the Elitch Theatre.  He was tasked with hiring the summer stock cast and selecting the plays for the season.

Partial filmography

Midnight at Maxim's (1915) - Mr. Shye
The Call of the Dance (1915) - Brace - Fisk's Lieutenant
Pals First (1918) - The Squirrel
Prestige (1931) - Capt. Emil de Fontenac
Okay, America! (1932) - Joe Morton
Flaming Gold (1932) - Harry Banning
Laughter in Hell (1933) - Zeb
Today We Live (1933) - Major
Strictly Personal (1933) - Jerry O'Conner
Destination Unknown (1933) - Dr. Fram
Out All Night (1933) - David Arnold
Carnival Lady (1933) - Harry
Sitting Pretty (1933) - Film Director (uncredited)
Madame Spy (1934) - Baum
Private Scandal (1934) - Insurance Agent Henry Lane
Whom the Gods Destroy (1934) - Henry Braverman
The Party's Over (1934) - Fred (uncredited)
The Man Who Reclaimed His Head (1934) - Jean - de Marnay's Butler (uncredited)
The Lives of a Bengal Lancer (1935) - The Ghasi - a Prisoner (uncredited)
The Gilded Lily (1935) - City Editor (uncredited)
The Mystery Man (1935) - Reporter (uncredited)
Murder on a Honeymoon (1935) - Hotel Clerk (uncredited)
Bride of Frankenstein (1935) - Neighbor (uncredited)
Mad Love (1935) - Varsac - Fingerprint Expert (uncredited)
Hot Tip (1935) - Henry Crumm
His Night Out (1935) - Dryer (uncredited)
Barbary Coast (1935) - Wigham
Professional Soldier (1935) - Cabinet Member
Magnificent Obsession (1935) - Panhandle Pete (uncredited)
I Conquer the Sea! (1936) - (uncredited)
Hell-Ship Morgan (1936) - Hawkins
Desire (1936) - Clerk to Perform Wedding (uncredited)
The Ex-Mrs. Bradford (1936) - North's 'Landlord' (717 Cosicosco St.) (uncredited)
Parole! (1936) - Butcher (uncredited)
The Devil-Doll (1936) - Detective
Anthony Adverse (1936) - Napoleon Bonaparte
Straight from the Shoulder (1936) - Mr. Blake
Yellowstone (1936) - Franklin Ross
White Legion (1936) - The Colonel
The Man I Marry (1936) - Woody Ryan
Come and Get It (1936) - Train Steward (uncredited)
Love Letters of a Star (1936) - Sigurd Repellen
The Accusing Finger (1936) - Dr. Simms
Four Days' Wonder (1936) - The Tramp
History Is Made at Night (1937) - Reservations Man at Victor's (uncredited)
Seventh Heaven (1937) - Matoot
Girl Loves Boy (1937) - Dr. Williams
Armored Car (1937) - Organist
The Last Train from Madrid (1937) - Hernandez (uncredited)
The Emperor's Candlesticks (1937) - Jailer (uncredited)
Souls at Sea (1937) - Parchy (uncredited)
The Women Men Marry (1937) - Peter Martin
Partners in Crime (1937) - Ex-Convict (uncredited)
The Westland Case (1937) - Amos Sprague
Stand-In (1937) - Scriptwriter (uncredited)
Night Spot (1937) - Vail
Arsène Lupin Returns (1938) - Duval
Goodbye Broadway (1938) - Merriweather
The Lady in the Morgue (1938) - Coroner
The Saint in New York (1938) - Bartender (uncredited)
Crime Ring (1938) - Mr. E.J. Goshen (uncredited)
Smashing the Rackets (1938) - Sam Schwartz - Butcher (uncredited)
Spawn of the North (1938) - Fisherman (uncredited) (final film role)

References

External links
 

1883 births
1938 deaths
20th-century American male actors
American male film actors